Jefferson Street Cemetery is a historic cemetery located at Ellicottville in Cattaraugus County, New York. The cemetery was established in 1817 and was the first to serve the village.  It is a settlement era burial ground consisting of eight to ten rows of burials. There are over 400 burials dating from 1817 to 2003.  The markers are of marble, granite, and sandstone.

It was listed on the National Register of Historic Places in 2012.

References

External links
 

Cemeteries on the National Register of Historic Places in New York (state)
Cemeteries in Cattaraugus County, New York
National Register of Historic Places in Cattaraugus County, New York